Sun Constellation System is an open petascale computing environment introduced by Sun Microsystems in 2007.

Main hardware components 
 Sun Blade 6048 Modular System
  Sun Blade X6275
  Sun Blade X6270
 Sun Blade 6000 System
  Sun Datacenter Switch 3456
 Sun Fire X4540
  Sun Cooling Doors (5200,5600)

Software stack 
 OpenSolaris or Linux
 Sun Grid Engine
 Sun Studio Compiler Suite
 Fortress (programming language)
 Sun HPC ClusterTools (based on Open MPI)
 Sun Ops Center

Services 
 Sun Datacenter Express Services

Production systems 

Ranger at the Texas Advanced Computing Center (TACC) was the largest production Constellation system. Ranger had 62,976 processor cores in 3,936 nodes and a peak performance of 580 TFlops. Ranger was the 7th most powerful TOP500 supercomputer in the world at the time of its introduction.
After 5 years of service at TACC, it was dismantled and shipped to South Africa, Tanzania, and Botswana to help foster HPC development in Africa.

A number of smaller Constellation systems are deployed at other supercomputer centers, including the University of Oslo.

References

External links 
 Sun Constellation System at Sun.com
 Sun Constellation System at SC07 (YouTube Video)

Sun Microsystems software
Sun Microsystems hardware
Petascale computers